Kuper (also Romanized as Kūper) is a village in Mangur-e Gharbi Rural District of the Central District of Piranshahr County, West Azerbaijan province, Iran. At the 2006 National Census, its population was 909 in 149 households. The following census in 2011 counted 911 people in 222 households. The latest census in 2016 showed a population of 958 people in 196 households; it was the largest village in its rural district.

References 

Piranshahr County

Populated places in West Azerbaijan Province

Populated places in Piranshahr County